Tith Dina ( born 5 June 1993) is a Cambodian footballer who plays for Boeung Ket in the Cambodian Premier League and also Cambodia national football team. He made his only appearance for the 2014 World Cup Qualifying match against Laos on 3 July 2011.

Career statistics

International goals
On 28 July 2016, he scored the winning goal in a 2-1 victory over Singapore in front of a sell-out crowd at the Olympic Stadium in Phnom Penh. At the 45+1 minutes he found himself at the end of a brilliant pass from Chan Vathanaka and netted the game's second goal to record Cambodia's first win over Singapore since 1972.

Senior team 

Scores and results list Cambodia goal tally first.

References

1993 births
Living people
Cambodian footballers
Cambodia international footballers
Association football midfielders
Sportspeople from Phnom Penh